Honey Bee 2: Celebrations (also known as Honey Bee 2) is a 2017 Indian Malayalam comedy film written and directed by Lal Jr. It is a sequel to the 2013 film Honey Bee and features Asif Ali, Bhavana, Baburaj, Sreenath Bhasi, Balu Varghese, Lal, Sreenivasan, and Lena. The film is produced by Lal under Lal Creations. Honey Bee 2: Celebrations released on 23 March 2017.

Angel's brothers decide to get their sister married to Sebastian. As the story moves closer to the wedding, the huge contrast in the cultures of both the families leads to a conflict of opinion.

Cast
 Asif Ali as Sebastian Thampi Antony
 Bhavana as Angel
 Baburaj as Fernando de Silva aka Ferno
 Sreenath Bhasi as Abu
 Balu Varghese as Ambrose Perera aka Ambros
 Sreenivasan as Thampi Antony
 Mamitha Baiju as Sisily,Thambi Atony's Daughter
 Arya Rohit as Sara Perera (Replaced Archana Kavi)
 Lal as HC Michael
 Lena as Ruby
 Krishna Praba as Ancy
 Suresh Krishna as Father Cochin/Collin's
 Arun as Vineeth
 Assim Jamal as Antony
 Harisree Asokan as Kappal Ory
 Amith Chakalakkal as Martin
 Kavitha Nair as Lisamma (Replaced Praveena)
 Joy Mathew as Cleetus
 Ponnamma Babu as Ferno's mother
 Prem Kumar as Chackochan, Thampi Antony's Brother 
 Ganapathi.S.Poduwal as Benny
 Sreelatha Namboothiri as Ammachi
 Telly Sebastian as Younger Age of Lal (HC Michael)
 Sudhi Koppa
 Anjana Appukuttan as TV Serial actress
 Rithu Manthra

Production
A sequel to Honey Bee was immediately announced after the release of the film in 2013. However, due to various reasons, the project got delayed for two years. Later, Lal Jr. announced that apart from the original cast, actors Sreenivasan and Lena would also be essaying pivotal roles in the film. The film's puja (blessing) ceremony was held on 7 November 2016 in Kochi.

Soundtrack

The film's soundtrack contains three songs, all composed by Deepak Dev. Lyrics by Santhosh Varma.

Release
Honey Bee 2 was released on 23 March 2017 in 125 screens across Kerala. It was released alongside Take Off.

References

External links
 

2010s Malayalam-language films
Indian chase films
Films about marriage
Indian comedy thriller films
2010s comedy thriller films
Indian sequel films
2017 comedy films